Sunset Lake is a lake in Holly Springs, North Carolina, part of the central North Carolina near Cary, NC and Apex, NC. Covering 125 acres in southwestern Wake County.  The lake is owned by the Sunset Lake Homeowners Association.

See also
Bass Lake (Holly Springs, North Carolina)
Bass Lake Dam (Holly Springs, North Carolina)
Wake County, North Carolina
Holly Springs, North Carolina
Fuquay-Varina, North Carolina

External links
 Google Street View of Sunset Lake and Sunset Lake Lodge
 Sunset Lake Lodge 3D Tour

Reservoirs in North Carolina
Protected areas of Wake County, North Carolina
Bodies of water of Wake County, North Carolina